Shopping King Louie is a South Korean drama starring Seo In-guk, Nam Ji-hyun, Yoon Sang-hyun and Im Se-mi. It aired on Wednesdays and Thursdays at 22:00 (KST) on MBC from September 21 to November 10, 2016.

Synopsis 
A romantic comedy about Louis (Seo In-guk), a rich heir who always spends money to buy everything that has a subtle beauty talking to his soul. One day he loses his memory and meets Bok-Shil (Nam Ji-hyun), a pure and energetic woman from the countryside. She is at first astounded by his spending habits. In the process of teaching him to only buy bare necessities or inexpensive small kindnesses that lighten up one's day, she also learns that bare necessities are not same for everyone as they depend on everyone's own values that shape their life and thus their shopping patterns. Both have innate innocence which bring them to care for each other, leading to undeniable love.

Cast

Main 

 Seo In-guk as Louis / Kang Ji-sung ( 25 Years Old )
The last surviving heir of a chaebol chairman. Having grown up in a sheltered and pampered environment in France, he turns to retail therapy to curb his loneliness. One day, he finds himself dropped into the bustling Seoul after having lost his memory. 
 Nam Ji-hyun as Ko Bok-shil ( 21 Years Old )
A country bumpkin from the Gangwon Province, who has a sweet personality. Though she is illiterate with technology, Bok-shil is quick on her feet and adapts well to situations.  
 Yoon Sang-hyun as Cha Joong-won
The director of Gold Group's merchandising department and Goldline.com. He has a prickly personality and is Louis's rival in love.
 Im Se-mi as Baek Ma-ri
Louis' childhood friend, who has a one-sided love for him because of his title. She later falls for her boss, Joong-won.

Supporting

People around Louis 
 Kim Young-ok as Choi Il-soon, Louis' grandma and the Chairman of Gold Group.
 Kim Sun-young as Heo Jung-ran, Il-soon's assistant
 Um Hyo-sup as Kim Ho-joon, Louis' butler

People around Bok-shil 
 Ryu Ui-hyun as Go Bok-nam, Bok-shil's brother
 Kang Ji-sub as Nam Joon-hyuk, Bok-shil's detective friend

People around Joong-Won 
 Nam Myung-ryul as Cha Soo-il, Joong-won's father
 Kim Bo-yeon as Shin Young-ae, Joong-won's mother

Employees at Gold Group 
 Kim Kyu-chul as Baek Sun-goo, Ma-ri's father; and the President of Gold Group who schemes to take over the conglomerate.
 Yoon Yoo-sun as Hong Jae-sook, Ma-ri's mother 
 Yoon Sa-bong as Yeji
 Kim Byung-chul as Lee Kyung-kook
 Cha Chung-hwa as Kwon Mi-young
 Lee Jae-kyoon as Byun Do-jin

Rooftop Neighbors 
 Oh Dae-hwan as Jo In-sung
 Hwang Young-hee as Hwang Geum-ja

Special appearances
 Mi-ram as Park Hye-joo
 Chae Soo-bin as Wang Mong-shil

Production 
First script reading took place July 15, 2016 at MBC Broadcasting Station in Sangam, South Korea and filming began on July 18. The series was based on Oh Ji-young's romantic comedy script which won the Excellence Prize in the 7th Broadcasting Foundation Scenario Contest (7회 드라마극본공모전 사막의별똥별찾기), hosted by the Broadcasting Contents Promotion Foundation in 2015. Despite the common material, ranging from amnesia to corporate heirs, the drama's storyline got praises from both fans and critics.

The filming location used for Louis' Castle in the first episode is the Château de Bourron near Paris in France.

Original soundtrack

OST Part 1

OST Part 2

OST Part 3

OST Part 4

OST Part 5

OST Part 6

OST Part 7

OST Part 8 
Songs featured in the television series but not included in the original soundtrack include:

 “She” by Elvis Costello, featured in Episodes 1, 3, 7, and 16
”A Whole New World” by Brad Kane and Lea Salonga, featured in Episode 2.
”Memory” by Barbra Streisand, featured in Episode 4.
”Goodnight Moon” by Shivaree, featured in Episode 5.
“I Was Born To Love You” by Queen, featured in Episode 6.
”Perhaps Love” by John Denver, featured in Episode 7.
 “Be My Baby” by The Ronettes , featured in Episode 8.
“Can’t Smile Without You” by Barry Manilow, featured in Episode 9. 
 “The Moon Represents My Heart” by Teresa Teng, featured in Episode 10.
“Reality” by Richard Sanderson, featured in Episode 12.
”My Way” by Frank Sinatra, featured in Episode 15.
“I’m Your Man” by Leonard Cohen, featured in the final episode.

Ratings 
 In the table below, the blue numbers represent the lowest ratings and the red numbers represent the highest ratings. 
 NR denotes that the drama did not rank in the Top 20 daily rankings.
 Each episode title is taken from a popular song title.

Note: Episode 5 didn't air on Wednesday, October 5 due to the live broadcast of the DMC Festival on MBC, the episode aired on Thursday, October 6.

Awards and nominations

International broadcast 
  - Oh!K (2016)
  - EBC (2017)
  - Teleamazonas (2018)
  - Viu
  - Willax (2018)

References

External links 

  
 

2016 South Korean television series debuts
2016 South Korean television series endings
MBC TV television dramas
South Korean romantic comedy television series
Television shows set in South Korea
Television shows set in France